Katsuhisa (written: 勝久, 克久 or 克寿) is a masculine Japanese given name as well as a surname. Notable people with the name include:

As a given name:
, Japanese daimyō
, Japanese businessman
, Japanese mixed martial artist
, Japanese musician and composer
, Japanese voice actor and actor
, Japanese footballer
, Japanese actor
, Japanese daimyō
, Japanese animator

As a surname:
, Japanese basketball coach

Japanese masculine given names